Bagheshlu (also Romanized as Bāgheshlū) is a village in Angut-e Gharbi Rural District, Anguti District, Germi County, Ardabil Province, Iran. At the 2006 census, its population was 234, in 40 families.

References 

Towns and villages in Germi County